The Northumberland Coalfield is a coalfield in north-east England. It is continuous with the Durham Coalfield to its south. It extends from Shilbottle in the north to the boundary with County Durham along the River Tyne in the south, beyond which is the Durham Coalfield.

The two contiguous coalfield areas were often referred to as the Durham and Northumberland Coalfield(s) or as the Great Northern Coalfield.

Coal seams
The following coal seams are recorded from the Northumberland Coalfield. They are listed here in stratigraphic order with the youngest at the top and the oldest/deepest at the bottom. Not all seams are named and not all occur at any one locality.

Pennine Coal Measures Group
(Westphalian)

Upper Coal Measures
 Killingworth
 West Moor
 Top Hebburn Fell
 Bottom Hebburn Fell
 Usworth

Middle Coal Measures
 Burradon
 Rowlington
 Top Ryhope Five-Quarter
 Bottom Ryhope Five-Quarter
 Ryhope Little
 Top Moorland
 Bottom Moorland
 Ashington
 High Main
 Metal
 Five-Quarter
 Bentinck
 Yard
 Top Bensham
 Bottom Bensham
 Top Durham Low Main
 Bottom Durham Low Main
 Northumberland Low Main
 Broomhill Main
 Top Plessey
 Plessey
 Bottom Plessey

Lower Coal Measures
 Beaumont
 Bottom Beaumont
 Top Tilley
 Tilley
 Bottom Tilley
 Top Busty
 Bottom Busty
 Three-Quarter
 Stobswood New
 Brockwell 
 Victoria
 Stobswood
 Marshall Green
 Ganister Clay
 Gubeon
 Saltwick

Yoredale Group

Stainmore Formation (Namurian)
 Stanton 
 Top Netherwitton
 Bottom Netherwitton
 Top Coatyards
 Bottom Coatyards
 Little Limestone

Alston Formation (Visean)
 Parrot 
 Townhead
 Shilbottle (Acre)
 Beadnell
 Greenses
 Blackhill
 Main

References

Coal mining regions in England
Geography of Northumberland
Mining in Northumberland
Geology of Northumberland